Rich Wilson is an American male sailor born on 20 April 1950 in Boston. He is an offshore sailor having extensively competed in the Figaro class.

Achievements
Reference
1980: Newport-Bermuda, Holger Danske, Overall Winner.
1988: C-STAR, Curtana – Class V Multihulls – 1st.
1990: San Francisco-Boston, Great American capsizes off Cape Horn.
1993: World Record: San Francisco-Boston, Great American II vs. Clipper Northern Light, 69 days.
2001 World Record: New York-Melbourne, Great American II vs. Clipper Mandarin, with Bill Biewenga, 68 days.
2003: World Record: Hong Kong-New York, Great American II vs. Clipper Sea Witch, with Rich du Moulin, 72 days.
2004: The Transat: Plymouth-Boston, Great American II; Class 2 Multihulls, 2nd place, 15 days, solo.
2008–2009: Vendée Globe: Great American III; finished 9th of 30 starters, 121 days.
2016–2017: Vendée Globe: Great American IV; finished 13th of 24 starters, 107 days.

References

External links
 Campaign Website

1950 births
Living people
Sportspeople from Boston
American male sailors (sport)
IMOCA 60 class sailors
American Vendee Globe sailors
2008 Vendee Globe sailors
2016 Vendee Globe sailors
Vendée Globe finishers
Single-handed circumnavigating sailors